Captives is a 1994 British romantic crime drama film directed by Angela Pope and written by the Dublin screenwriter Frank Deasy. It stars Julia Ormond, Tim Roth and Keith Allen. The picture was selected as the opening film in the Venetian Nights section of the 1994 Venice Film Festival, in addition to its selection for Gala Presentation at the 1994 Toronto International Film Festival.

Plot
After the break-up of her marriage to Simon (Peter Capaldi), dentist Rachel Clifford (Julia Ormond) throws herself into work by taking an extra assignment at a local British prison. One of her patients is Philip (Tim Roth), a man nearing the end of a ten-year sentence for a crime he refuses to reveal. She later sees him on the street when he is released to attend his college class. They form a friendship that eventually turns into a secret relationship. Their relationship becomes strained when Rachel realises Philip is serving time for the murder of his wife.

Another inmate, Towler (Colin Salmon), sells drugs within the prison. He uncovers Rachel and Philip's relationship and uses his associate Kenny (Mark Strong) to intimidate her into smuggling a gun into the prison. She ultimately cannot go through with it and Philip, realising that she is out of her depth, reveals their relationship to the authorities in order to secure her help. When Kenny confronts Rachel in a diner, she uses the gun to shoot him as the police arrive.

In the aftermath, Rachel is found to have shot Kenny in self-defense and Philip is transferred to another prison. In spite of everything that has occurred, she indicates that she would like to continue her relationship with him.

Production
The film was a BBC Films co-production with Distant Horizon.

Cast
 Julia Ormond as Rachel Clifford
 Tim Roth as Philip Chaney
 Keith Allen as Lenny
 Mark Strong as Kenny
 Siobhan Redmond as Sue
 Peter Capaldi as Simon
 Colin Salmon as Towler
 Richard Hawley as Sexton
 Annette Badland as Maggie
 Jeff Nuttall as Harold
 Kenneth Cope as Dr. Hockley
 Bill Moody as Surgery Officer
 Nathan Dambuza as Moses
 Christina Collingridge as Katie
 Victoria Scarborough as Dental Nurse
 Anthony Kernan as "Blackie"

Reception
The movie received a mixed response.

Box office
The movie debuted at No.6.

References

External links
 
 
 

1994 films
BBC Film films
British independent films
1994 romantic drama films
British prison drama films
Films about dentistry
Films scored by Colin Towns
British romantic drama films
1994 independent films
Romantic crime films
1990s English-language films
1990s British films